Harmony Ikande (born 17 September 1990) is a Nigerian professional footballer who plays as a midfielder.

Club career
Ikande was signed by Serie A club Milan in 2009. He played in their youth system until January 2010, when he was sent out on loan to Prima Divisione side Monza for six months. At the beginning of the 2010–11 season he was loaned out to Poggibonsi. However, he was called back in January 2011 and he was signed on another loan deal by Spanish side Extremadura. Ikande now plays for Maccabi Yavne in the Israel Liga Leumit.

International career
At international level, he represented Nigeria at the 2009 FIFA U-20 World Cup, playing 2 games.  Ikande was then called in May 2011 to be part of the Dream Team V, the Nigerian U-23 team, and played their friendly game against Costa Rica national football team.

Career statistics

References

External links
Profile at Assocalciatori.it 

1990 births
Living people
Nigerian footballers
Nigeria international footballers
Nigeria under-20 international footballers
Association football midfielders
A.C. Milan players
A.C. Monza players
U.S. Poggibonsi players
Budapest Honvéd FC players
Budapest Honvéd FC II players
Beitar Jerusalem F.C. players
Hapoel Ashkelon F.C. players
Hapoel Tel Aviv F.C. players
FK Sarajevo players
Maccabi Yavne F.C. players
Aris Limassol FC players
Hapoel Nof HaGalil F.C. players
Hapoel Ramat Gan F.C. players
Al-Jabalain FC players
Saham SC players
Al-Shoulla FC players
Al-Washm Club players
Serie C players
Israeli Premier League players
Liga Leumit players
Nemzeti Bajnokság I players
Saudi First Division League players
Oman Professional League players
Saudi Second Division players
Nigerian expatriate footballers
Nigerian expatriate sportspeople in Italy
Nigerian expatriate sportspeople in Spain
Nigerian expatriate sportspeople in Hungary
Nigerian expatriate sportspeople in Israel
Nigerian expatriate sportspeople in Cyprus
Nigerian expatriate sportspeople in Oman
Nigerian expatriate sportspeople in Saudi Arabia
Expatriate footballers in Italy
Expatriate footballers in Spain
Expatriate footballers in Hungary
Expatriate footballers in Israel
Expatriate footballers in Bosnia and Herzegovina
Expatriate footballers in Cyprus
Expatriate footballers in Saudi Arabia
Expatriate footballers in Oman
Sportspeople from Kano